The Tour de Famelon (2,143 m) is a mountain of the Swiss Prealps, located north of Leysin in the canton of Vaud. It lies between the Tour de Mayen and the Pierre du Moëllé, on the range lying between the lake of Hongrin and the valley of Ormont Dessous and Ormont Dessus.

References

External links

 Tour de Famelon on Hikr

Mountains of the Alps
Mountains of the canton of Vaud
Mountains of Switzerland